Senator Klein may refer to:

Jeffrey D. Klein (born 1960), New York State Senate
Jerry Klein (born 1951), North Dakota State Senate
Lori Klein (politician) (fl. 1990s–2010s), Arizona State Senate
Matt Klein (born 1967), Minnesota State Senate
Ron Klein (born 1957), Florida State Senate

See also
Senator Kline (disambiguation)